Brucella anthropi is a bacterium. The type strain is strain CIP 82.115 (= CIP 14970 = NCTC 12168 = LMG 3331). O. anthropi strains are rod-shaped, aerobic, gram-negative, non-pigmented and motile by means of peritrichous flagella. They are emerging as major opportunistic pathogens.

References

Further reading

Gascón, F., et al. "Neumonía extrahospitalaria con bacteriemia por Ochrobactrum anthropi en un niño inmunocompetente." Revista de Diagnóstico Biológico 51.2 (2002): 69–70.

External links 

Type strain of Ochrobactrum anthropi at BacDive -  the Bacterial Diversity Metadatabase

Hyphomicrobiales
Bacteria described in 1988